Gianluca Paparesta (born 25 May 1969 in Bari) is a former Italian football referee. He was implicated in the 2006 Calciopoli scandal, and has not refereed since.

Biography
He has never refereed any World Championship or European Championship matches, but has refereed nine matches in the UEFA Cup, as well as 2006 World Cup qualifiers.

In May 2014, Paparesta headed a consortium that bought Serie B club A.S. Bari for € 4.8 million. 

In August 2019, he was unveiled as part of the non-technical staff at the newly-refounded Palermo, where he will be in charge of media-related duties.

References

External links
Official webpage

Italian football referees
Sportspeople from Bari
1969 births
Living people
S.S.C. Bari